The Chancellor of Justice (JK) is a Swedish government agency (with the agency head holding the same title as the agency name) charged with representing the Government of Sweden in various legal matters as the government's ombudsman. The office was originally created through a decree issued by King Charles XII in 1713.

The Chancellor is appointed by the Government and serves at its pleasure, though without belonging to the spoils system; the longest term in office this far having been 22 years. The present Chancellor of Justice is Mari Heidenborg, who entered office on September 1, 2018.

List
 Anders Leijonstedt (1714–1718)
Chancellor of Justice:

See also
Legal, Financial and Administrative Services Agency

References

External links
 

Government agencies of Sweden
National law enforcement agencies of Sweden